The Two-man bobsleigh event in the IBSF World Championships 2016 was held on 13–14 February 2016.

Results
The first two runs were started at 09:34 on 13 February 2016 and the last two runs on 14 February at 09:34.

References

Two-man